Ingushskiy Okrug was a district (okrug) of the Terek Oblast of the Caucasus Viceroyalty of the Russian Empire. The area of the Ingushskiy okrug made up part of the North Caucasian Federal District of Russia.

Geography 
It was located in the central part of the North Caucasus in the basin of the Terek, Sunzha, Assa and Fortanga rivers, covering the territory of modern Ingushetia, parts of the Mozdok and Prigorodny regions of North Ossetia, Sernovodsky and parts of the Achkhoy-Martanovsky regions of the Chechen Republic.

History 

Formed in 1860. Until 1860 of the 19th century, the mountain population of the North Caucasus was subordinate to the military authorities of the Left (North-Eastern Caucasus) and Right (North-Western Caucasus) flanks of the Caucasian Line. Civil administration was only in the Stavropol province. After the end of the Caucasian War, the military administration of the Caucasus was eliminated. In 1860, the entire territory of the North Caucasus was divided into the Stavropol province, Kuban, Terek and Dagestan oblasts.

The administrative center of the Ingushskiy Okrug, together with the Ossetian Okrug, was Vladikavkaz. The Ingush district consisted of three sections: Nazranovsky, Psedakhsky, Gorsky and also Karabulaksky which was liquidated in 1865. Significant lands of the plain of Ingushetia in 1864-1865, after the construction of Cossack villages on them, were directly subordinated to the Terek Cossack Host. In 1866, the territory of the Meredzhi and Akka societies was separated from the Gorsky section of the Ingush district and subordinated to the administration of the Argun Okrug.

In 1870, the Ingush Okrug, together with the Cossack villages on the Sunzha, was merged with the Ossetian district into one Vladikavkazsky okrug, which covered a vast territory from the Urukh River in the west to the Fortanga River in the east.

On February 2, 1870, a project was approved to establish an agricultural farm and school in the Ingush district.

In 1888, the lands of the Ingush Okrug, together with the lands of the Terek Cossack army on the Sunzha, formed the united Ingush-Cossack Sunzhensky Otdel of the Terek Oblast. The Sunzhensky Otdel in 1909 split into two districts —Nazranovsky and Sunzhensky.

Demographics 
The main population of the district were Ingush (including part of the Orstkhoys) and Cossacks. The largest settlements according to the 1891 census were the following: Bazorkino - 4047 inhabitants, Ekazhevo - 3821, Nasyrkort - 3645, Kantyshevo - 2766, Plievo - 2766, Surkhokhi - 2271, Upper Achaluki - 1938, Middle Achaluki - 1505, Lower Achaluki - 1309, Gamurzievo - 1582, Altievo - 1000, Yandare - 1616, Badgers - 1595, Dalakovo - 1739, Sagopshi - 2098, Psedakh - 1402, Nazran Fortress - 1200.

Administrative divisions 
In administrative terms, initially in 1862 Ingushkiy Okrug was divided into 4 subcounties (uchastoks) and the lands of the villages on the Sunzha subordinate to the Terek Cossack army. However, in 1865 the number of sites was reduced to three. The subcounties of the Ingushskiy okrug were as follows:

 Settlements of Nazranovsky uchastok: Bazorkino, Kantyshevo, Surkhakhi, Ekazhevo, Nasyr-Kort, Alty, Gamurzievo, Bursuk, Plievo, Dolakovo, Upper Achaluki.

 Settlements of Psedakhsky uchastok: Sagopshi, Geirbek-Yurt, Psedakh, Keskem, Lower Keskem, Bekovichi, Guchuk-Yurt, Lower Achaluki, Middle Achaluki, Upper Achaluki.

 Settlements of Gorskiy uchastok: Dzheyrakh, Pamyat, Armkhi, Lyazhgi, Tsori, Khamkhi, Tumgi, Khuli, Egikhal, Bisht, Doshkhakle, Kyazi, Shoan, Salgi, Metskhal, Garkh, Furtoug, Kusht, Koshk Morch, Eban, Kerbete, Harp, Beyni, Olgeti, Tsoli, Niy, Pyaling, Targim, Barkhane, Barakh, Leimi, Kart, Ozdik, Nilkh, Pui, Tsorkh, Kyakhk, Ersh, Ezmi, Kost, Nyakist, Hani, Gadaborsh, Torsh, Tori, Hay, Koli, Myashkhi, Vovnushki, Tsyzdy, Gul. In 1866, the settlements of Akki and parts of the Meredzhi societies — Yalkhoroy, Akki, Vilah, Kerete, Galanchozh, Kerbychi, Orzmikale, Vauge — were separated from the Gorsky section of the Ingushsky Okrug and attached to the Argunskiy Okrug.

 Settlements of Karabulaksky uchastok: Botash-Yurt, Gazi-Yurt, Shinal-Yurt, Akhbarzoy, Arshty, Nesterovsky, Bamut, Chemulga, Mergist, Bereshki, Dattykh.

Notes

References

Bibliography 
 
 
 

History of Ingushetia
Okrugs of Terek Oblast